Trichordestra is a genus of moths of the family Noctuidae.

Species
 Trichordestra beanii (Grote, 1877) (alternative spelling Trichordestra beani)
 Trichordestra dodii (Smith, 1904)
 Trichordestra legitima (Grote, 1864)
 Trichordestra lilacina (Harvey, 1874)
 Trichordestra liquida (Grote, 1881)
 Trichordestra prodeniformis (Smith, 1888)
 Trichordestra rugosa (Morrison, 1875)
 Trichordestra tacoma (Strecker, 1900)

References
Natural History Museum Lepidoptera genus database
Trichordestra at funet

Hadenini